Aleksa Matić (Serbian Cyrillic: Алекса Матић; born 12 March 1996) is a Serbian professional footballer who plays for Loznica in the Serbian First League.

References

1996 births
Living people
Serbian footballers
Sportspeople from Sombor
FK Spartak Subotica players
FK Palić players
FK Bačka 1901 players
Association football midfielders
FK BSK Batajnica players
FK Spišská Nová Ves players
2. Liga (Slovakia) players
FK Budućnost Dobanovci players
Serbian expatriate footballers
Expatriate footballers in Slovakia
Serbian expatriate sportspeople in Slovakia